Schauenstein is a town  in the district of Hof, in Bavaria, Germany. It is situated 13 km west of Hof.

References

Hof (district)